The Korea Aviation Accident Investigation Board (KAIB, 항공사고조사위원회) was a South Korean agency that investigated aviation accidents and incidents. Around 2005 its headquarters were in Gonghang-dong, Gangseo-gu, Seoul, near Gimpo International Airport, and its flight data recorder/cockpit voice recorder and wreckage laboratory was located on the property of Gimpo Airport. Around 2004 it had been headquartered in Gwacheon, Gyeonggi-do.

The agency was established on August 12, 2002, replacing the Investigation Division of the Civil Aviation Bureau, Ministry of Construction and Transportation. On July 10, 2006, the Aviation and Railway Accident Investigation Board formed as a result of a merger between the KAIB and the Railway Accident Investigation Board.

Investigations
 Air China Flight 129

See also

 Korea Office of Civil Aviation (South Korean civil aviation agency)
 Korean Maritime Safety Tribunal (maritime accident investigation agency)
 The Korea Transport Institute (South Korean transportation research institute)

References

External links
 Accident Investigation Board (Archive)
 Accident Investigation Board (Archive) 

Organizations investigating aviation accidents and incidents
Government agencies of South Korea
Transport in South Korea
2002 establishments in South Korea
2006 disestablishments in South Korea
Aviation organizations based in South Korea